Denis Erio Pederson (born September 10, 1975) is a Canadian former professional ice hockey player. He played a total of 435 games in the National Hockey League and then went on to great success playing for Eisbären Berlin in Germany.

Career 
A native of Prince Albert, Saskatchewan, Pederson played for the Carlton Park Mustangs and joined his hometown team Prince Albert Raiders when he was 16 years old.

He was selected by the New Jersey Devils in the 1993 NHL Draft (first round, 13th overall). He continued playing for the Raiders in the WHL and also spent time with AHL’s Albany River Rats, before making his NHL debut with the Devils during the 1995-96 season.

In 2000, he was traded along with Brendan Morrison from the New Jersey Devils to the Vancouver Canucks in exchange for Alexander Mogilny.

Until 2003, he played 435 games in the National Hockey League for the New Jersey Devils, Vancouver Canucks, Phoenix Coyotes and Nashville Predators.

From 2003 to 2012, Pederson played for Eisbären Berlin of the German top-flight Deutsche Eishockey Liga (DEL) and won six German championships as well as the 2010 European Trophy with the team. He had his jersey number 20 retired by the Berlin club in December 2015.

Pederson was inducted into the Prince Albert Sports Hall of Fame in 2015.

Career statistics

Regular season and playoffs

International

Awards
 WHL East Second All-Star Team – 1994

External links

https://ca.linkedin.com/in/denis-pederson-bb323598

References 

1975 births
Living people
Albany River Rats players
Sportspeople from Prince Albert, Saskatchewan
Nashville Predators players
National Hockey League first-round draft picks
New Jersey Devils draft picks
New Jersey Devils players
Peoria Rivermen (AHL) players
Phoenix Coyotes players
Prince Albert Raiders players
Vancouver Canucks players
Ice hockey people from Saskatchewan
Eisbären Berlin players
Canadian ice hockey centres
Canadian ice hockey right wingers